Andixius venustus, is a species of planthoppers belonging to the family Cixiidae. It is endemic to China.

Body and antennae yellowish brown. A large bifurcate process found on right side of flagellum. Left side of periandrium with a medium process apically.

References

External links

Insects described in 1991
Cixiidae